Viroids are small single-stranded, circular RNAs that are infectious pathogens. Unlike viruses, they have no protein coating. All known viroids are inhabitants of angiosperms (flowering plants), and most cause diseases, whose respective economic importance to humans varies widely. A recent metatranscriptomics study suggests that the host diversity of viroids and others viroid-like elements is broader than previously thought and that it would not be limited to plants, encompassing even the prokaryotes.

The unique properties of viroids have been recognized by the International Committee on Taxonomy of Viruses,  in creating a new order of subviral agents.

The first recognized viroid, the pathogenic agent of the potato spindle tuber disease, was discovered, initially molecularly characterized, and named by Theodor Otto Diener, plant pathologist at the U.S Department of Agriculture's Research Center in Beltsville, Maryland, in 1971. This viroid is now called potato spindle tuber viroid, abbreviated PSTVd.  The Citrus exocortis viroid (CEVd)  was discovered soon thereafter, and together understanding of PSTVd and CEVd shaped the concept of the viroid.

Although viroids are composed of nucleic acid, they do not code for any protein. The viroid's replication mechanism uses RNA polymerase II, a host cell enzyme normally associated with synthesis of messenger RNA from DNA, which instead catalyzes "rolling circle" synthesis of new RNA using the viroid's RNA as a template. Viroids are often ribozymes, having catalytic properties that allow self-cleavage and ligation of unit-size genomes from larger replication intermediates.

Diener initially hypothesized in 1989 that viroids may represent "living relics" from the widely assumed, ancient, and non-cellular RNA world, and others have followed this conjecture. Following the discovery of retrozymes, it has been proposed that viroids and other viroid-like elements may derive from this newly found class of retrotransposon.

The human pathogen hepatitis D virus is a subviral agent similar in structure to a viroid.

Taxonomy

:
Family Pospiviroidae
Genus Pospiviroid; type species: Potato spindle tuber viroid;  356–361 nucleotides(nt)
Tomato chlorotic dwarf viroid; (TCDVd); accession AF162131, genome length 360nt
Mexican papita viroid; (MPVd); accession L78454, genome length 360nt
Tomato planta macho viroid; (TPMVd); accession K00817, genome length 360nt
Citrus exocortis viroid; 368–467 nt
Chrysanthemum stunt viroid; (CSVd); accession V01107, genome length 356nt
Tomato apical stunt viroid; (TASVd); accession K00818, genome length 360nt
Iresine 1 viroid; (IrVd-1); accession X95734, genome length 370nt
Columnea latent viroid; (CLVd); accession X15663, genome length 370nt
Genus Hostuviroid; type species: Hop stunt viroid; 294–303 nt
Genus Cocadviroid; type species: Coconut cadang-cadang viroid;  246–247 nt
Coconut tinangaja viroid; (CTiVd); accession M20731, genome length 254nt
Hop latent viroid; (HLVd); accession X07397, genome length 256nt
Citrus IV viroid; (CVd-IV); accession X14638, genome length 284nt
Genus Apscaviroid; type species: Apple scar skin viroid; 329–334 nt
Citrus III viroid; (CVd-III); accession AF184147, genome length 294nt
Apple dimple fruit viroid; (ADFVd); accession X99487, genome length 306nt
Grapevine yellow speckle 1 viroid; (GVYSd-1); accession X06904, genome length 367nt
Grapevine yellow speckle 2 viroid; (GVYSd-2); accession J04348, genome length 363nt
Citrus bent leaf viroid; (CBLVd); accession M74065, genome length 318nt
Pear blister canker viroid; (PBCVd); accession D12823, genome length 315nt
Australian grapevine viroid; (AGVd); accession X17101, genome length 369nt
Genus Coleviroid; type species: Coleus blumei viroid 1; 248–251 nt
Coleus blumei 2 viroid; (CbVd-2); accession X95365, genome length 301nt
Coleus blumei 3 viroid; (CbVd-3); accession X95364, genome length 361nt
Family Avsunviroidae
Genus Avsunviroid; type species: Avocado sunblotch viroid; 246–251 nt
Genus Pelamoviroid; type species: Peach latent mosaic viroid; 335–351 nt
Genus Elaviroid; type species: Eggplant latent viroid; 332–335 nt

Transmission and replication

Viroids only infect plants, and infectious viroids can be transmitted to new plant hosts by aphids, by cross contamination following mechanical damage to plants as a result of horticultural or agricultural practices, or from plant to plant by leaf contact. Upon infection, viroids replicate in the nucleus (Pospiviroidae) or chloroplasts (Avsunviroidae) of plant cells in three steps through an RNA-based mechanism. They require RNA polymerase II, a host cell enzyme normally associated with synthesis of messenger RNA from DNA, which instead catalyzes "rolling circle" synthesis of new RNA using the viroid as template.

Unlike plant viruses which produce movement proteins, viroids are entirely passive, relying entirely on the host. This is useful in the study of RNA kinetics in plants.

RNA silencing
There has long been uncertainty over how viroids induce symptoms in plants without encoding any protein products within their sequences. Evidence suggests that RNA silencing is involved in the process. First, changes to the viroid genome can dramatically alter its virulence. This reflects the fact that any siRNAs produced would have less complementary base pairing with target messenger RNA. Secondly, siRNAs corresponding to sequences from viroid genomes have been isolated from infected plants. Finally, transgenic expression of the noninfectious hpRNA of potato spindle tuber viroid develops all the corresponding viroid-like symptoms. This indicates that when viroids replicate via a double stranded intermediate RNA, they are targeted by a dicer enzyme and cleaved into siRNAs that are then loaded onto the RNA-induced silencing complex. The viroid siRNAs contain sequences capable of complementary base pairing with the plant's own messenger RNAs, and induction of degradation or inhibition of translation causes the classic viroid symptoms.

Retroviroids
Retroviroids and retroviroid-like elements are viroids, which are RNA that have a DNA homologue. These entities are thought to be largely exclusive to the carnation, Dianthus caryophyllus, that are closely related to the family of viruses termed 'carnation small viroid-like RNA' (CarSV RNA). These elements may act as a homologous substrate upon which recombination may occur and are linked to double-stranded break repair. These elements are dubbed retroviroids as the homologous DNA is generated by reverse transcriptase that is encoded by retroviruses.

RNA world hypothesis
Diener's 1989 hypothesis had proposed that the unique properties of viroids make them more plausible macromolecules than introns, or other RNAs considered in the past as possible "living relics" of a hypothetical, pre-cellular RNA world. If so, viroids have assumed significance beyond plant virology for evolutionary theory, because their properties make them more plausible candidates than other RNAs to perform crucial steps in the evolution of life from inanimate matter (abiogenesis).  Diener's hypothesis was mostly forgotten until 2014, when it was resurrected in a review article by Flores et al., in which the authors summarized Diener's evidence supporting his hypothesis as:
 Viroids' small size, imposed by error-prone replication.
 Their high guanine and cytosine content, which increases stability and replication fidelity.
 Their circular structure, which assures complete replication without genomic tags.
 Existence of structural periodicity, which permits modular assembly into enlarged genomes.
 Their lack of protein-coding ability, consistent with a ribosome-free habitat.
 Replication mediated in some by ribozymes—the fingerprint of the RNA world.

The presence, in extant cells, of RNAs with molecular properties predicted for RNAs of the RNA world constitutes another powerful argument supporting the RNA world hypothesis. However, the origins of viroids themselves from this RNA world has been cast into doubt by several factors, including the discovery of retrozymes (a family of retrotransposon likely representing their ancestors) and their complete absence from organisms outside of the plants (especially their complete absence from prokaryotes including bacteria and archaea). However, recent studies suggest that the diversity of viroids and  others viroid-like elements is broader than previously thought and that it would not be limited to plants, encompassing even the prokaryotes. Matches between viroid cccRNAs and CRISPR spacers suggest that some of them might replicate in prokaryotes.

Control
The development of tests based on ELISA, PCR, and nucleic acid hybridization has allowed for rapid and inexpensive detection of known viroids in biosecurity inspections, phytosanitary inspections, and quarantine. However, the ongoing discovery and evolution of new viroids makes such assays always incomplete.

History
In the 1920s, symptoms of a previously unknown potato disease were noticed in New York and New Jersey fields. Because tubers on affected plants become elongated and misshapen, they named it the potato spindle tuber disease.

The symptoms appeared on plants onto which pieces from affected plants had been budded—indicating that the disease was caused by a transmissible pathogenic agent. A fungus or bacterium could not be found consistently associated with symptom-bearing plants, however, and therefore, it was assumed the disease was caused by a virus. Despite numerous attempts over the years to isolate and purify the assumed virus, using increasingly sophisticated methods, these were unsuccessful when applied to extracts from potato spindle tuber disease-afflicted plants.

In 1971, Theodor O. Diener showed that the agent was not a virus, but a totally unexpected novel type of pathogen, 1/80th the size of typical viruses, for which he proposed the term "viroid". Parallel to agriculture-directed studies, more basic scientific research elucidated many of viroids' physical, chemical, and macromolecular properties. Viroids were shown to consist of short stretches (a few hundred nucleotides) of single-stranded RNA and, unlike viruses, did not have a protein coat. Viroids are extremely small, from 246 to 467 nucleotides, than other infectious plant pathogens; they thus consist of fewer than 10,000 atoms. In comparison, the genomes of the smallest known viruses capable of causing an infection by themselves are around 2,000 nucleotides long.

In 1976, Sanger et al. presented evidence that potato spindle tuber viroid is a "single-stranded, covalently closed, circular RNA molecule, existing as a highly base-paired rod-like structure"—believed to be the first such molecule described. Circular RNA, unlike linear RNA, forms a covalently closed continuous loop, in which the 3' and 5' ends present in linear RNA molecules have been joined. Sanger et al. also provided evidence for the true circularity of viroids by finding that the RNA could not be phosphorylated at the 5' terminus. In other tests, they failed to find even one free 3' end, which ruled out the possibility of the molecule having two 3' ends. Viroids thus are true circular RNAs.

The single-strandedness and circularity of viroids was confirmed by electron microscopy, The complete nucleotide sequence of potato spindle tuber viroid was determined in 1978. PSTVd was the first pathogen of a eukaryotic organism for which the complete molecular structure has been established. Over thirty plant diseases have since been identified as viroid-, not virus-caused, as had been assumed.

Four additional viroids or viroid-like RNA particles were discovered between 2009 and 2015.

In 2014, New York Times science writer Carl Zimmer published a popularized piece that mistakenly credited Flores et al. with the hypothesis' original conception.

See also

References

External links 
 Viroids/ATSU
 ViroidDB, a database of viroids and viroid-like circular RNAs